Four ships of the Royal Navy have been named HMS Brighton, after the seaside town of Brighton. 

  was a 14-gun tender purchased in 1795 and captured by the French in 1797.
 , a passenger ferry requisitioned from the London, Brighton and South Coast Railway in 1914, used as a troopship and later as a hospital ship.
  was a  during the Second World War
  was a  launched in 1959 and scrapped in 1985.

Royal Navy ship names